Nicholas Kemboi may refer to:

 Nicholas Kemboi (born 1983), Kenyan-born Qatari long-distance runner
 Nicholas Kiptanui Kemboi (born 1989), Kenyan middle distance runner